William John D'Amico (October 3, 1910 – October 30, 1984) was an American bobsledder who competed in the late 1940s and early 1950s. He won a gold medal in the four-man event at the 1948 Winter Olympics in St. Moritz.

D'Amico also won three medals at the FIBT World Championships with two golds (Four-man: 1949, 1950) and one bronze (Two-man: 1950).

References 
 Bobsleigh four-man Olympic medalists for 1924, 1932-56, and since 1964
 Bobsleigh two-man world championship medalists since 1931
 Bobsleigh four-man world championship medalists since 1930
 

1910 births
1984 deaths
American male bobsledders
Bobsledders at the 1948 Winter Olympics
Olympic gold medalists for the United States in bobsleigh
Medalists at the 1948 Winter Olympics